Holåbreen is a glacier in the municipalities Skjåk (in Innlandet county) and Luster (in Vestland county) in Norway. The glacier lies between the mountains Gjelhøi and Holåtindan.

See also
List of glaciers in Norway

References

Glaciers of Innlandet
Glaciers of Vestland
Skjåk
Luster, Norway